William Brownlow PC (I) (10 April 1726 – 28 October 1794) of Lurgan, Co. Armagh was an Anglo-Irish politician.

He was the only son of William Brownlow MP and Lady Elizabeth Hamilton, daughter of James Hamilton, 6th Earl of Abercorn and Elizabeth Reading.

Brownlow served as High Sheriff of Armagh for 1750 and was first elected to the Irish House of Commons as the Member of Parliament for Armagh County in 1753, styled The Right Honourable and holding the seat until his death. He was also returned for the Strabane constituency in 1768, but was replaced in 1769. He was an officer of the Irish Volunteers and one of the founding subscribers of the Bank of Ireland in 1783. He was generally seen as a reformer, although there were allegations that he misused public funds to improve his demesne.

He married firstly Judith Letitia Meredyth, daughter of the Reverend Charles Meredyth, Dean of Ardfert, and had at least two sons: his heir William, and Charles. He married secondly Catherine Hall, daughter of Roger Hall of Mount Hall, County Down, by whom he had at least six further children; including Elizabeth, who married John Bligh, 4th Earl of Darnley, and the Rev. Francis Brownlow, who married Catherine, daughter of Anthony Brabazon, 8th Earl of Meath.

William, his eldest son and heir, also became an MP for County Armagh and founded the bank of William Brownlow Esq.,& Co. Charles became a Lieutenant-Colonel in the 57th Foot and succeeded his childless brother in 1815. Charles's son, also named Charles, became 1st Baron Lurgan.

Notes

References

1726 births
1794 deaths
18th-century Anglo-Irish people
William
Irish MPs 1727–1760
Irish MPs 1761–1768
Irish MPs 1769–1776
Irish MPs 1776–1783
Irish MPs 1783–1790
Irish MPs 1790–1797
Members of the Privy Council of Ireland
Members of the Parliament of Ireland (pre-1801) for County Armagh constituencies
Members of the Parliament of Ireland (pre-1801) for County Tyrone constituencies
High Sheriffs of Armagh